Rory Kiely (1 May 1934 – 13 June 2018) was an Irish Fianna Fáil politician. Kiely was an unsuccessful candidate for the Dáil at the 1969 general election for the Limerick West. Kiely was first elected in 1977, to the 14th Seanad. He was re-elected by the Agricultural Panel to every subsequent Seanad, except for the short-lived 16th Seanad in 1982, until he retired in 2007. He was the Cathaoirleach of Seanad Éireann from 2002 to 2007.

He was born in Feenagh, Kilmallock, County Limerick. A farmer, he was married to Eileen Kiely (née O'Connor) and had two sons and two daughters. He was educated at C.B.S. Charleville, County Cork and University College Cork (Diploma in Social and Rural Science).

He was a trustee of the Gaelic Athletic Association (GAA) and was a member of Munster Council GAA from 1982. He was also a former chairman of Limerick GAA county board.

He died on 13 June 2018 at the age of 84.

References

1934 births
2018 deaths
Cathaoirligh of Seanad Éireann
Members of the 14th Seanad
Members of the 15th Seanad
Members of the 17th Seanad
Members of the 18th Seanad
Members of the 19th Seanad
Members of the 20th Seanad
Members of the 21st Seanad
Members of the 22nd Seanad
Fianna Fáil senators
Irish farmers
Politicians from County Limerick
Alumni of University College Cork
People educated at C.B.S. Charleville